Indukuri Sunil Varma (born 28 February 1974), known mononymously as Sunil, is an Indian actor who works in Telugu films. Noted for his comic roles, Sunil has appeared in over 180 films in his career, including around 1IFC0 films in lead role. He has won three state Nandi Awards and two Filmfare Awards South.

Sunil played a lead role in Andala Ramudu (2006) and later went on to star in several films including commercial successes like Maryada Ramanna (2010), Poola Rangadu (2012), and Tadakha (2013).

Career
Sunil started his career in 1996 when first worked as an extra in the film Akkada Ammayi Ikkada Abbayi, however, Sunil's scenes did not make it to the final cut of the film. His career began on a slow note with movies like Second Hand (which was stopped from production), and Peruleni Cinema. Prema Katha and Swayamvaram were his first real opportunities in the industry. Chiru Navvutho and Nuvve Kavali were the first films that he acted in. Nuvve Kavali was the first one to release.

In 2010, Sunil starred in S. S. Rajamouli-directed Maryada Ramanna, which was a commercial success. A reviewer from Sify noted that: "Sunil would no longer look like a comedy hero. His dances are simply superb."

Sunil was cast in the lead role in Poola Rangadu, directed by Veerabhadram Chowdhary. which was released across 450 theatres worldwide. The film received positive reviews. He was the antagonist in the film Colour Photo (2020), which brought him critical acclaim.

The 2021 film Pushpa: The Rise saw Sunil in an unusual role of a serious gangster Mangalam Seenu, very different from the comedy roles he usually plays.

Personal life 
Sunil hails from Bhimavaram of Andhra Pradesh, India. Sunil celebrated his 40th birthday for a noble cause donating to a blind school and spending time with them.

Director Trivikram Srinivas and Sunil were friends since their days in Bhimavaram. They, along with director Gunasekhar, stayed together as roommates in Punjagutta neighbourhood during their struggling days. As of 2016, Trivikram maintains the room by paying rent as a memory.

Awards

Filmfare Awards South 
 Best Comedian – Telugu – Peda Babu (2004)
 Best Supporting Actor - Telugu – Tadakha (2013)

Nandi Awards 
 Best Male Comedian – Nuvvu Nenu (2001)
 Best Male Comedian – Andhrudu (2005)
 Special Jury Award – Maryada Ramanna (2010)

South Indian International Movie Awards 

 SIIMA Award for Best Supporting Actor (Telugu)  – Tadakha (2013)

Santosham Film Awards 

 Santosham Best Comedian Award - Aravinda Sametha Veera Raghava (2018)

Filmography

As an actor

As a dubbing artist

Television

References

External links
 

Living people
21st-century Indian male actors
Indian male voice actors
People from West Godavari district
1974 births
Male actors in Telugu cinema
Indian male film actors
Male actors from Andhra Pradesh
Nandi Award winners
Filmfare Awards South winners
Indian male comedians
South Indian International Movie Awards winners
People from Andhra Pradesh
CineMAA Awards winners
Santosham Film Awards winners
Indian comedians
Telugu comedians
Indian male actors